Volker Heyer (born 29 July 1970) is a German judoka.

Achievements

References
 

1970 births
Living people
German male judoka
Universiade medalists in judo
Goodwill Games medalists in judo
Universiade bronze medalists for Germany
Medalists at the 1995 Summer Universiade
Competitors at the 1994 Goodwill Games
20th-century German people